The 2011–12 Slohokej League season was the third and final season of the Slohokej League. Partizan were the defending champions, having won their first title the previous season.

2011–12 teams

Standings

Playoffs

Quarter-finals

Partizan – Bled 2–0 (4–0, 11–1)
Triglav Kranj – Slavija 2–0 (5–4, 7–4)
Olimpija – Mladost 2–0 (7–5, 2–1)

Maribor received a bye.

Semi-finals

Partizan – Triglav Kranj 2–0 (6–0, 4–1)
Maribor – Olimpija 0–2 (3–4, 2–3 OT)

Third place

Maribor – Triglav Kranj 1–2 (4–2, 5–6 OT, 2–5)

Final

Partizan – Olimpija 3–2 (4–2, 0–1, 4–2, 2–5, 6–1)

2011–12 in European ice hockey leagues
Slohokej League seasons
Slohokej
Articles containing video clips